Joshua Bryant (born July 2, 1940) is an American actor, director, author, and speaker who is the founder of the Taos Talking Pictures Film Festival  in Taos, New Mexico.

Early life and education 
Bryant was born in Norfolk, Virginia. After attending the Pasadena Playhouse College of Theater Arts and the Royal Academy of Dramatic Art in London and serving for three years in the Signal Corps, he began a career in the theater that eventually led to his starring, guest-starring in several television shows.

Career 
Bryant's movie credits have included acting roles in films and television movies, such as The Curious Female (1970), Black Noon (1971), Enter the Devil (1972), A Scream in the Streets (1973), The Morning After (1974), Trapped Beneath the Sea (1974), Framed (1975), The Night That Panicked America (1975), Maneaters Are Loose! (1978), Salem's Lot (1979), First Monday in October (1981), Gone Are the Dayes (1984), The Education of Allison Tate (1986), and Project Eliminator (1991) He was also active in television, including guest roles on Columbo, Little House on the Prairie, M*A*S*H (three episodes), The Rockford Files (four episodes) and Barnaby Jones (four episodes).

For four years, Bryant hosted the syndicated series, Game Warden Wildlife Journal.

Personal life 
In June 2018, Joshua Bryant told Le Populaire du Centre newspaper that he had decided to leave the United States with his wife, Melinda Mullins, if the Bush administration invaded Iraq. In response to the 2003 invasion of Iraq, Bryant and his wife organized or sold all their property and relocated to the Limousin region of France.

Filmography

Film

Television

References

External links
 
 
 
 

1940 births
Living people
American expatriates in France
American male television actors
American male film actors
Male actors from Virginia
People from Portsmouth, Virginia
Alumni of RADA